Yogeshwar Mahto is an Indian politician from Jharkhand. He is a member of Bhartiya Janata Party. In 2014, he was elected as a member of the Jharkhand Legislative Assembly from Bermo constituency, however Yogeshwar Mahto lost in the 2019 Assembly elections. In Bermo, Congress's Rajendra Prasad Singh defeated BJP's Yogeshwar Mahto.

References 

Living people
Year of birth missing (living people)
Bharatiya Janata Party politicians from Jharkhand
People from Bokaro district
Jharkhand MLAs 2014–2019
Jharkhand MLAs 2005–2009